Terry Sherwood is a non-profit organizer, American politician, and Democrat member of the Wyoming House of Representatives, representing the 14th district since January 12, 2021.

Career
Sherwood serves as Director for Laramie Main Street, a non-profit organization that strives to preserve historic Downtown Laramie while enhancing its economic and social vitality. Sherwood is also affiliated with the Laramie Public Art Coalition. On August 18, 2020, Sherwood defeated Alexander Simon, in the Democrat primary for the Wyoming House of Representatives seat representing the 14th district. On November 3, 2020, Sherwood was elected to this position, defeating Republican Matthew Burkhart by under 100 votes. Sherwood was sworn in on January 4, 2021.

Personal life
Sherwood lives in Laramie, Wyoming. She is Lutheran.

References

Living people
Democratic Party members of the Wyoming House of Representatives
Sherwood, Trey
21st-century American politicians
Year of birth missing (living people)